10 Shake is an Australian free-to-air digital television multichannel owned by Network 10. It launched on 27 September 2020 at 6am.

The channel includes a mix of shows for people aged forty and under. It broadcasts programming for children from 6am to 6pm, and from 6pm to 6am shows for young teens to adults.

History
In May 2020, ViacomCBS Australia and New Zealand Chief Content Officer and Executive Vice President, Beverley McGarvey, announced that Network 10 would unveil a fourth digital channel later in the year. Complementing Channel 10, 10 Peach and 10 Bold, the fourth channel would appeal to the under 50s audience. Further announcements about the channel would be made in the coming months.

On 13 July 2020, it was announced that Network 10 would launch a third digital channel, 10 Shake, in September, with the name partially inspired by British sister network Channel 5, whose youth block is branded as Milkshake!. The network carries children's programmes (drawing primarily television series from Nickelodeon brands), while evening and prime time hours feature "edgy" series and films targeting young adults under 40, including programmes from Comedy Central and MTV, and other imported programmes such as The Late Late Show with James Corden. 10 Shake also share their Paramount Global television programmes (including CBS, MTV, Nickelodeon, and Comedy Central) with 9Go!, 9Gem, SBS Viceland, ABC Kids, and ABC ME and carry movies from Warner Bros, Village Roadshow, DC Films, and New Line Cinema.

It was confirmed on 13 September 2020 that the new multi channel would launch on Sunday 27 September on Channel 13 in metropolitan markets in time for children's school holidays in many states. Regional viewers via WIN Television were required to access streaming platform 10 Play to find the new content, since WIN did not plan to launch 10 Shake in the near future. But with WIN re-affiliating with the Nine Network in 2021, 10 immediately signed for a re-affiliation deal with SCA that would include carriage of that channel.

On 14 September 2022, 10 Shake launched on Foxtel.

Programming
10 Shake features a mix of repeated shows from their slate of output deals, and shows that make their debut on Australian free-to-air television. Most of its programming is sourced from the library of Network 10's parent company Paramount and its television brands from CBS, MTV, Nickelodeon, Comedy Central, and other television shows that are not Paramount shows. Also the film brands from Paramount, Warner Bros., Village Roadshow, New Line Cinema, and Lionsgate, but the movies come from various distributors and it won't be all from Paramount anymore. Furthermore, a number of Paramount programmes (including television brands from Viacom, CBS, MTV, Comedy Central, and Nickelodeon)  is provided to other channels, 9Go!, 9Gem, SBS Viceland, ABC Kids, and ABC ME by contractual agreements already in place, following by the same Nickelodeon television programmes with different seasons for 9Go! and 10 Shake will be upcoming, sometime in 2023.

However, Nickelodeon, MTV and Comedy Central television programmes has been also taken over on 10 due to COVID-19 from 2020 to the present.

10 Shake airs local Australian children's programming, including Totally Wild, Crocamole and other C-classified dramas. Also locally produced for the network is short-form series Shake Takes which is inspired by social media influencers and supported by integration from sponsors such as VTech, Toyworld, Spin Master and The Accent Group.

The network also has ongoing content new and classic film and television brands from Paramount Pictures, Miramax, DreamWorks Pictures, Village Roadshow Pictures, Roadshow Films, Warner Bros. Pictures, Lionsgate and STX Entertainment.

Current programming

Adult animation

 BoJack Horseman
 South Park

Children's

 Breadwinners (2020–present)
 Bunsen Is a Beast (2021–present)
 The Bureau of Magical Things (2021–present)
 The Casagrandes (2023–present)
 Dive Club (2021–present)
 Game Shakers (2021–present)
 The Haunted Hathaways (2021–present)
 Henry Danger (2020–present)
 iCarly (2020–present)
 It's Pony (2023–present)
 The Loud House (2020–present)
 Nick News (2022–present)
 Nicky, Ricky, Dicky & Dawn (2020–present)
 Rock Island Mysteries (2022–present)
 Sam & Cat (2020–present)
 Sanjay and Craig (2020–present)
 Shake Takes (2020–present)
 SpongeBob SquarePants (2020–present)
 Star Trek: Prodigy (2022–present)
 The Thundermans (2020–present)
 T.U.F.F. Puppy (2022–present)
 Victorious (2020–present)

Preschool

 Abby Hatcher (2021–present)
 Baby Shark's Big Show! (2022–present)
 Blaze and the Monster Machines (2020–present)
 Blue's Clues & You! (2020–present)
 Bubble Guppies (2020–present)
 Butterbean's Café (2020–present)
 Calvin & Kaison's Play Power! (2022–present)
 Corn & Peg (2021–present)
 Dora and Friends: Into the City! (2021–present)
 Dora the Explorer (2020–present)
 PAW Patrol (2020–present)
 Ready Set Dance (2020–present)
 Ryan's Mystery Playdate (2021–present)
 Santiago of the Seas (2022–present)
 Shimmer and Shine (2020–present)
 Team Umizoomi (2020–present)
 Top Wing (2020–present)

Comedy

 Comedy Central Roast 
 Drunk History USA
 Inside Amy Schumer
 The Middle
 The Office
 Ridiculousness
 Roast Battle
 Tosh.0

Light entertainment

 The Daily Show with Trevor Noah
 Gogglebox Australia
 Gogglebox UK
 Have You Been Paying Attention?
 Hughesy, We Have a Problem
 The Challenge Australia 
 Shaun Micallef's Brian Eisteddfod 
 The Late Late Show with James Corden 
 The Graham Norton Show

Award shows

 MTV Video Music Awards (same-day encore)
 MTV Europe Music Awards (same-day encore)

Reality

 The Bachelorette Australia
 Catfish: The TV Show
 The Charlotte Show
 Ex on the Beach UK
 Fear Factor
 Hunted Australia
 Junior MasterChef Australia
 Just Tattoo of Us
 Lip Sync Battle
 The Masked Singer USA
 Pimp My Ride
 Teen Mom USA
 Teen Mom Australia (simulcast with MTV)
 Total Wipeout (includes Winter Wipeout and Total Wipeout: Freddie and Paddy Takeover)

Upcoming programming

Children's
 Danger Force
 Monster High
 Transformers: EarthSpark
 Tyler Perry's Young Dylan

Preschool
 Deer Squad
 Ricky Zoom
 Sunny Day

Former programming

Adult animation
 The Cleveland Show (2020–21, Now on 7mate)

Children's

 Big Time Rush (2020–21)
 For Real! (2020)
 Harvey Beaks (2020–21)
 How to Rock (2021–22)
 Hunter Street (2020)
 I Am Frankie (2021)
 Teenage Mutant Ninja Turtles (1987 series) (2020–21)
 Totally Wild (2020–21)
 WITS Academy (2021)

Preschool

 Crocamole (2020–21)
 Fresh Beat Band of Spies (2020–21)
 Transformers: Rescue Bots (2021)

Comedy

 Sabrina the Teenage Witch (2020–21, now on 10 Peach)

Availability
10 Shake is available on channel 13 in 576i standard definition from the network's five metropolitan owned-and-operated stations, TEN Sydney, ATV Melbourne, TVQ Brisbane, ADS Adelaide, and NEW Perth, and other stations CTC Southern NSW/ACT, TNQ Regional QLD, GLV/BCV Regional VIC and TDT Tasmania.

Identity history
2020–present: Shake It Up!

Notes

References

External links

Network 10
Digital terrestrial television in Australia
English-language television stations in Australia
Television channels and stations established in 2020
2020 establishments in Australia
Children's television channels in Australia